The 2009 Armenian Premier League season was the eighteenth since its establishment. The season began on 21 March 2009 and ended on 7 November 2009. FC Pyunik were the defending champions.

There were no teams promoted from the previous season of the First League. Therefore, Kilikia FC play another season in the top league. Only 8 teams were allowed to play in the 2009 Armenian Premier League.

The league was played in four stages. Teams played each other four times, twice at home and twice away. FC Pyunik gained maximum points after round 28 and were crowned champions; winning their ninth consecutive title, twelfth overall. Ararat Yerevan were relegated to Armenian First League.

Participating teams

League table

Results

First half of season

Second half of season

Top goalscorers
Last updated: November 7, 2009; Source: ffa.am

See also
 2009 Armenian First League
 2009 Armenian Cup

External links
 ffa.am
 soccerway.com
 uefa.com
 rsssf.com

Armenian Premier League seasons
1
Armenia
Armenia